Thomas J. Brown may refer to:

 Thomas J. Brown (bishop of Maine) (born 1970), American Episcopal bishop
 Thomas J. Brown (judge) (1836–1915), Chief Justice of the Supreme Court of Texas
 Thomas James Brown (1886–1970), British coal miner and Labour Party politician
 Thomas John Brown (born 1943), Anglican bishop in New Zealand

See also
Thomas Brown (disambiguation)